Henry Hughes may refer to:

 H. Stuart Hughes (1916–1999), American historian, professor, and activist
 Henry Hughes, 19th century British locomotive builder, see Brush Traction
 Henry Hughes (Vicar Apostolic of Gibraltar) (1788–1860), Irish-born Roman Catholic bishop and Franciscan friar
 Henry George Hughes (1810–1872), Irish judge and politician
 Henry Hughes (New South Wales politician) (fl. 1850s), Australian politician
 Henry Hughes (1850s), stained-glass window designer and partner in the firm Ward and Hughes
 Henry Kent Hughes (1814–1880), pastoralist and politician in the South Australian House of Assembly
 Henry Hughes (sociologist) (1829–1862), American lawyer, sociologist, state senator and Confederate officer from Mississippi
 Henry P. Hughes (1904–1968), American jurist from Wisconsin
 Henry Hughes (director), American film director
 Henry Hughes (cricketer) (born 1992), English cricketer

See also
 Harry Hughes (disambiguation)
 Henry Hewes (disambiguation)
 Henry Hewes (politician) (born 1949), American anti-abortion activist and candidate